A Maze and Amazement is the debut album by New Zealand post-rock band The Enright House, released in May 2007, on A Low Hum Records.

Track listing

Personnel
Mark Roberts – production, performance, vocals, art direction
Tristen Deschain – guitar harmonics on "Darkwave Equals MC Squared"
Mary E. Jones – poetry reading on "Solitare" and "Remember the Stillness", art direction
Evan Schaare – synthesisers on "Do Re Mi"
Nick Harte – drums on "We Might as Well Have Stayed Young"
Amelia Radford – violas on "We Might as Well Have Stayed Young"

Reception 
New Zealand music site UnderTheRadar rated the album four hearts out of five, describing it as a mostly instrumental album and praising its "lush flowing arrangements scattered with intensity but also relaxed structure."

External links
 A Maze and Amazement at Discogs

References

2007 debut albums
The Enright House albums